Klaas Bolt (March 6, 1927 in Appingedam – April 11, 1990 in Haarlem) was a Dutch organist and improviser. He taught improvisation at the Sweelinck Conservatory (named for Jan Pieterszoon Sweelinck, a Dutch organist and composer of the Renaissance) in Amsterdam, where Masaaki Suzuki was among his students. Bolt was a proponent of the use of slow tempi when playing hymns. He played many hymns at his weekly evening hymn sings, which drew substantial audiences. He would typically improvise the hymn introductions at these events.

References

External links
https://web.archive.org/web/20080512031001/http://www.maxx-absorbents.nl/klaasbolt.htm (in Dutch)

1927 births
1990 deaths
Dutch classical organists
Male classical organists
Organ improvisers
Academic staff of the Conservatorium van Amsterdam
People from Appingedam
20th-century classical musicians
20th-century organists
20th-century Dutch male musicians